Benjamin Aaron Garcia (born May 19, 1976) is an American chemist and Professor at the Washington University in St. Louis. His research interests revolve around developing novel mass spectrometry methods to analyze post-translational modifications of proteins and epigenetics. His work has resulted in over 250 publications and he has been recognized with numerous honors including the American Society for Mass Spectrometry Biemann Medal in 2018.

Raised in La Mirada, California, Garcia received his BS in Chemistry from UC Davis in 2000 and his PhD from the University of Virginia in 2005 where he worked with Donald Hunt. His doctoral thesis was entitled Proteomic Applications of Tandem Mass Spectrometry. After postdoctoral work with Neil Kelleher, he was appointed as an assistant professor at Princeton University where he worked until his appointment at the University of Pennsylvania School of Medicine in 2012. In 2016, he was promoted to full Professor.

References

1976 births
Living people
People from La Mirada, California
University of California, Davis alumni
University of Virginia alumni
21st-century American chemists
Mass spectrometrists
Princeton University faculty
University of Pennsylvania faculty
Washington University in St. Louis faculty